Oleh Fedorchuk (born February 10, 1961), is a retired Soviet footballer and Ukrainian football manager.

Career
In 2009–2011, he was a coach in PFC Nyva Vinnytsia. He signed a two-year contract on July 1, 2009, and left FC Nyva in October 2011.

References

Living people
1961 births
People from Korosten
Soviet footballers
FC Volyn Lutsk players
FC Systema-Boreks Borodianka players
FC Dnipro Cherkasy players
MFC Mykolaiv players
FC Ros Bila Tserkva players
FC Temp Shepetivka players
Ukrainian football managers
FC Obolon Kyiv managers
FC Nyva Vinnytsia managers
FC Knyazha Shchaslyve managers
FC Krymteplytsia Molodizhne managers
FC Nafkom Brovary managers
SC Tavriya Simferopol managers
MFC Mykolaiv managers
FC Poltava managers
FC Enerhiya Nova Kakhovka
Association football defenders
Sportspeople from Zhytomyr Oblast